Tom Tiddler's ground, also known as Tom Tidler's ground or Tommy Tiddler's ground, is a longstanding children's game. One player, "Tom Tiddler", stands on a heap of stones, gravel, etc. Other players rush onto the heap, crying "Here I am on Tom Tiddler's ground, picking up gold and silver," while Tom tries to capture, or in other versions, expel the invaders. By extension the phrase has come to mean the ground or tenement of a sluggard, or of one easily outwitted; or to mean any place where money is picked up and acquired readily. The essence of the game lives on in more modern versions such as steal the bacon and variants of tag.

In literature
"Tom Tiddler's Ground" is the title of an 1861 short story by Charles Dickens, and the phrase "Tom Tiddler's ground" appears in his novels Nicholas Nickleby, David Copperfield and Dombey and Son. "Tom Tiddler's Ground" is the title of a 1931 poem and a 1931 anthology of children's poetry edited by Walter de la Mare, and of a 1934 novel by Edward Shanks. E. F. Benson mentions "Tom Tiddler's ground" in his 1935 novel The Worshipful Lucia. Nancy Mitford in The Pursuit of Love (1949) writes, "Their life with Uncle Matthew was a sort of perpetual Tom Tiddler's ground." "Tom Tiddler's Ground" is the name for a piece of waste land in the 1962 children's novel No One Must Know by Barbara Sleigh. The gold and silver coins in chapter 16 of C.S. Forester's Hornblower and the Atropos are said to be on Tom Tiddler's Ground. In Agatha Christie's novel, The Mirror Crack'd from Side to Side (1962), William Tiddler, a police sergeant who assists Chief Inspector Craddock, is referred to by locals as "Tom Tiddler".
Also appears in "Miss Duveen," a short story by Walter de la Mare.

Other uses
"Tom Tiddler's Ground" is a song on the 1970 album Flat Baroque and Berserk by Roy Harper.

Tom Tiddler's ground is also used in modern English as a euphemism for having an uncertain status, for example, "I asked her why her performance review was late and I could tell she was on Tom Tiddler's ground".

See also
King of the Hill (game)

References

External links
"Tom Tiddler's Ground" by Charles Dickens at Project Gutenberg
"Tom Tiddler's Ground" at wikisource

Charles Dickens
Children's games